Longo is a surname. Notable people with the surname include:

Alessandro Longo (1864–1945), Italian composer and musicologist
Andrea Longo (disambiguation), multiple people
Annalie Longo (born 1991), New Zealand women's football player
Antonio Longo (disambiguation), multiple people
Bartolo Longo (1841–1926), Italian lawyer beatified by the Roman Catholic Church
Carlos Ortiz Longo (born 1962), Puerto Rican mechanical and materials science engineer
Christian Longo (born 1974), convicted murderer
Dennise Longo Quiñones (fl. 1990s–2010s), Puerto Rican lawyer and government official
Evan Longoria (born 1985), nicknamed Longo
Gonzalo Longo (born 1974), Argentine rugby union footballer
Jeannie Longo (born 1958), French racing cyclist
Joseph S. Longo (1914–1993), Justice of the Connecticut Supreme Court
Luigi Longo (1900–1980), Italian communist politician
Mike Longo (1937–2020), American jazz pianist, composer, and author
Robert Longo (born 1953), American painter and sculptor
Roberto Longo (cyclist) (born 1984), Italian road racing cyclist
Roberto Longo (mathematician) (born 1953), Italian mathematician and mathematical physicist
Saadia ben Abraham Longo, Turkish Hebrew poet
Samuele Longo (born 1992), Italian professional footballer
Tom Longo (1942–2015), American football defensive back
Valter Longo (born 1967), Italian biogerontologist and cell biologist
Trent Longo (born 1992), American actor

See also

Longo's, a supermarket chain in the Greater Toronto Area
Longos (disambiguation)
Longus, ancient Greek author
Luongo, a surname
Lungo, a coffee beverage

Italian-language surnames